The Women's 4 x 100 metres relay athletics events for the 2016 Summer Paralympics took place at the Estádio Olímpico João Havelange between 14 and 15 September 2016. A total of two events was contested over this distance, with the T11-T13 event being open to three different disability classifications for visually impaired athletes and the T35-38 event open to four classifications for athletes with cerebral palsy or similar impairments.

Schedule

Results

T11-13

T35-38

References

Athletics at the 2016 Summer Paralympics
2016 in women's athletics